The BelAZ 75710 is an ultra class haul truck manufactured in  Belarus by BelAZ. As of 2013, it was the world's largest, highest payload capacity haul truck.

Design
The BelAZ 75710 has a conventional two-axle setup but the wheels are doubled, one to an axle, imitating the 1950s International Payhauler 350. For this reason it needs two 59/80R63 tires. It also has four-wheel drive and four-wheel hydraulic steering which is unusual.

The 75710 is claimed to carry a  load. The bed is relatively shallow, limiting the volume of material that can be carried.

These are coupled to two AC alternators and four AC traction motors (two in each axle.)

Project history
BelAZ produces the 75710 in a new facility constructed by Soligorsk Construction Trust No. 3. Overall, BelAZ has invested $954 million in increasing its total production capacity. 

References

External links
 Specification sheet
 75710-series homepage
 Белоруский монстр удивил мир! Как устроен Белаз 75710 (russian)
Haul trucks
75710
Vehicles introduced in 2013